Nkosinathi Mthiyane is a midfielder. He plays for Chippa United in the South African Premier Soccer League.

References

Living people
1986 births
Association football midfielders
AmaZulu F.C. players
South African soccer players